Newark College may refer to:

 Newark College of Arts and Sciences, college in Rutgers University–Newark
 Newark College, Nottinghamshire, branch of Lincoln College, Lincolnshire
 Newark College of Engineering, former name of New Jersey Institute of Technology
 Newark College or Academy, early names of the institution that became University of Delaware